Thomas Eugene Robbins (born July 22, 1932) is a best-selling and prolific American novelist. His most notable works are "seriocomedies" (also known as "comedy drama"), such as Even Cowgirls Get the Blues. Tom Robbins has lived in La Conner, Washington since 1970, where he has written nine best-selling books. His latest work, published in 2014, is Tibetan Peach Pie, which is a self-declared "un-memoir". Even Cowgirls Get the Blues has been adapted into a movie that shares the same name by Gus Van Sant in 1993.

Early life
Robbins was born on July 22, 1932, in Blowing Rock, North Carolina, to George Thomas Robbins and Katherine Belle Robinson. Both of his grandfathers were Baptist preachers. The Robbins family resided in Blowing Rock before moving to Warsaw, Virginia, when the author was still a young boy. In adulthood, Robbins has described his young self as a "hillbilly".

Robbins attended Warsaw High School (class of 1949) and Hargrave Military Academy in Chatham, Virginia, where he won the Senior Essay Medal. The following year he enrolled at Washington and Lee University to major in journalism, leaving at the end of his sophomore year after being disciplined by his fraternity for bad behavior and failing to earn a letter in basketball.

In 1953, he enlisted in the Air Force after receiving his draft notice, spending a year as a meteorologist in Korea, followed by two years in the Special Weather Intelligence unit of the Strategic Air Command in Nebraska. He was discharged in 1957 and returned to Richmond, Virginia, where his poetry readings at the Rhinoceros Coffee House led to a reputation among the local bohemian scene.

Early media work
In late 1957, Robbins enrolled at Richmond Professional Institute (RPI), a school of art, drama, and music, which later became Virginia Commonwealth University. He served as an editor and columnist for the college newspaper, Proscript, from 1958 to 1959. He also worked nights on the sports desk of the daily Richmond Times-Dispatch.  After graduating with honors from RPI in 1959 and indulging in some hitchhiking, Robbins joined the staff of the Times-Dispatch as a copy editor.

In 1962, Robbins moved to Seattle to seek an M.A. at the Far East Institute of the University of Washington.  During the next five years in Seattle (minus a year spent in New York City researching a book on Jackson Pollock) he worked for the Seattle Times as an art critic. In 1965, he wrote a column on the arts for Seattle Magazine as well as occasionally for Art in America and Artforum.  Also during this time, he hosted a weekly alternative radio show, Notes from the Underground, at non-commercial KRAB-FM, Seattle.  It was in 1967, while writing a review of the rock band The Doors, that Robbins says he found his literary voice. While working on his first novel, Robbins worked the weekend copy desk of the Seattle Post-Intelligencer. Robbins would remain in Seattle, on and off, for the following forty years.

Writing career
In 1966, Robbins was contacted and then met with Doubleday's West Coast Editor, Luthor Nichols, who asked Robbins about writing a book on Northwest art. Instead Robbins told Nichols he wanted to write a novel and pitched the idea of what was to become Another Roadside Attraction.

In 1967, Robbins moved to South Bend, Washington, where he wrote his first novel. In 1970, Robbins moved to La Conner, Washington, and it was at his home on Second Street that he subsequently authored nine books (although, in the late 1990s, he spent two years living on the Swinomish Indian reservation).

In the 1980s and early 1990s, Robbins regularly published articles and essays in Esquire magazine, and also contributed to Playboy, The New York Times, and GQ.

When Robbins began writing Jitterbug Perfume in 1982, Robbins made a contract with editor Alan Rinzler. As he had a large following, he had the leverage to stipulate a contract with Rinzler where they would accompany Tom on three holiday trips to resorts Tom would choose where he could discuss the work-in-progress novel, which Rinzler later discovered was Jitterbug Perfume. Alan Rinzler later wrote this on the topic of editing for Robbins:Tom would read out loud from his work in progress, and I would comment. Just a few pages at a time. He was a real southern gentleman, and welcomed intellectual discourse about his theme, characters, and intentions, from the inside. He took the process of conception, research, trial and error, moving things around, changing voices and pitch very seriously, wrote slowly and carefully, revised constantly, developing, refining and evolving this novel over the course of about two years.Michael Dare described Robbins' writing style in the following manner: "When he starts a novel, it works like this. First he writes a sentence. Then he rewrites it again and again, examining each word, making sure of its perfection, finely honing each phrase until it reverberates with the subtle texture of the infinite. Sometimes it takes hours. Sometimes an entire day is devoted to one sentence, which gets marked on and expanded upon in every possible direction until he is satisfied. Then, and only then, does he add a period". When Robbins was asked to explain his "gift" for storytelling in 2002, he replied:

I'm descended from a long line of preachers and policemen. Now, it's common knowledge that cops are congenital liars, and evangelists spend their lives telling fantastic tales in such a way as to convince otherwise rational people that they're factual. So, I guess I come by my narrative inclinations naturally.

Over the course of his writing career, Robbins has given readings on four continents, in addition to the performances that he has delivered at festivals from Seattle to San Miguel de Allende. Robbins also read at Bumbershoot in 2014.

Awards and praise
In 1997, Robbins won the Bumbershoot Golden Umbrella Award for Lifetime Achievement in the arts that is presented annually by the Bumbershoot arts festival in Seattle.

In 2000, Robbins was named one of the 100 Best Writers of the 20th Century by Writer's Digest magazine, while the legendary Italian critic Fernanda Pivano called Robbins "the most dangerous writer in the world".

In October 2012, Robbins received the 2012 Literary Lifetime Achievement Award from the Library of Virginia.

In 2015, Robbins was awarded the Willamette Writers' Lifetime Achievement Award and received the award at the Gala Awards Event at the Willamette Writers Conference on August 8, 2015.

Other activities

In the mid-sixties, as a member of the Seattle Arts scene, Robbins reviewed art for several publications in Seattle, wrote essays for museum catalogs, organized gallery exhibits, and was the self-described ringleader in a "boisterous neo-Dada gang of guerilla artists, the Shazam Society".

Robbins has defended, in print, Indian mystic Osho, although he was never a follower. Robbins spent three weeks at ceremonial sites in Mexico and Central America with mythologist Joseph Campbell, and studied mythology in Greece and Sicily with the poet Robert Bly. Robbins also traveled to Timbuktu.

As of 2013, Robbins is a member of the Marijuana Policy Project's advisory board, alongside numerous other notable figures such as Jack Black, Ani DiFranco, Tommy Chong, and Jello Biafra; he has been honoured at the Laureate Dinner of Seattle's Rainier Club that has also recognized other local figures, such as Charles Johnson, Stephen Wadsworth, Timothy Egan and August Wilson; and he sits on the board of directors of The Greater Seattle Bureau of Fearless Ideas (formerly 826 Seattle), "a nonprofit writing and tutoring center dedicated to helping youth, ages six to 18, improve their creative and expository writing skills, and to helping teachers inspire their students to write."

Madame Zoe, a Richmond psychic and palm reader who once lived in Richmond's South Side, was fictionalized in Robbins' Even Cowgirls Get the Blues. In 2016 Richmond artists Noah Scalin and Thea Duskin recreated her bedroom as an installation in the art gallery at Chop Suey Books in Carytown in Richmond.

Their novel Even Cowgirls Get the Blues was adapted into a movie in 1993 by Gus Van Sant and stars Uma Thurman, Lorraine Bracco, and Keanu Reeves.

Personal life

Robbins was a friend of Terence McKenna, whose influence appears evident in a couple of his books. A main character (Larry Diamond) in Half Asleep in Frog Pajamas advocates a theory similar to those of McKenna, involving the history and cultural influences of psychedelic plants. Robbins also spent time with Timothy Leary and the author has said that one of the protagonists in Jitterbug Perfume (Wiggs Dannyboy) exhibited certain characteristics of Leary's personality; Robbins has acknowledged using LSD with Leary.

He is friends with Gus Van Sant, and performed the voice-over narration in Van Sant's film adaptation of Even Cowgirls Get the Blues.  He has been friends with directors Robert Altman and Alan Rudolph, as well, and has had small speaking parts in five feature films.

Partial bibliography
Robbins has written eight novels since 1971. He has also written numerous short stories and essays, mostly collected in the volume Wild Ducks Flying Backward, and one novella, B Is for Beer.

Nonfiction
Guy Anderson (monograph—16 pages of biographical notes within a collection of Anderson's work) (1965)
Tibetan Peach Pie: A True Account of an Imaginative Life (autobiography) (2014)

Novels
 Another Roadside Attraction (1971)
 Even Cowgirls Get the Blues (1976)
 Still Life with Woodpecker (1980)
 Jitterbug Perfume (1984)
 Skinny Legs and All (1990)
 Half Asleep in Frog Pajamas (1994)
 Fierce Invalids Home from Hot Climates (2000)
 Villa Incognito (2003)

Collections
 Wild Ducks Flying Backward (2005) — a collection of essays, reviews, and short stories.

Novellas
 B Is for Beer (2009)

Notes

References

 Tom Robbins Papers, Collection Number M 90, Special Collections and Archives, James Branch Cabell Library, Virginia Commonwealth University, Richmond, Va

Further reading

External links
Interviews and articles
The Syntax of Sorcery: An Interview with Tom Robbins (2012)
Oral history interview with Tom Robbins, 1984 Mar. 3, Archives of American Art, Smithsonian Institution (1984)
From Blowing Rock to Windy Cliff: A Tentative Chronology 
A biographical essay (2003)
Basking Robbins Interview (1985)
Salon.com mini-bio (2000)
Seattle Weekly interview (2000)
Tom Robbins's advice to writers
Notes From the Underground with Tom Robbins; Archives of radio station KRAB, Seattle, July 7, 1967
Video interview with Tom Robbins by The Authors Road

Other websites 
Dharma Yum - Weblog of the AFTRLife

20th-century American novelists
21st-century American novelists
American male novelists
American satirists
Novelists from North Carolina
Writers from Richmond, Virginia
Writers from Seattle
Living people
Virginia Commonwealth University alumni
Postmodern writers
1932 births
Journalists from Virginia
20th-century American male writers
21st-century American male writers
Novelists from Virginia
Novelists from Washington (state)
20th-century American non-fiction writers
21st-century American non-fiction writers
American male non-fiction writers
People from La Conner, Washington
Seattle Post-Intelligencer people
Hargrave Military Academy alumni